Langrenus is an impact crater located near the eastern lunar limb. The feature is circular in shape, but appears oblong due to foreshortening. It lies on the eastern shore of the Mare Fecunditatis. To the south is the overlapping crater pair Vendelinus and the smaller Lamé.

The inner wall of Langrenus is wide and irregularly terraced, with an average width of about 20 kilometers. The outer ramparts are irregular and hilly, and there is a bright, fragmented ray system spread across the mare to the west. The interior of the crater has a higher albedo than the surroundings, so the crater appears bright when the Sun is overhead. The crater floor is covered by many boulders, and is slightly irregular in the northwest half. The central peaks rise about a kilometer above the floor, and a peak on the eastern rim ascends to an altitude of 3 km.

On December 30, 1992, Audouin Dollfus of the Observatoire de Paris observed a series of glows on the floor of this crater using the one-meter telescope. These glows changed form with time, and Dollfus expressed the belief that this was likely a gaseous emission. The cracked floor of the crater may have been the source of the gas.

Flemish astronomer Michael van Langren was the first person to draw a lunar map while giving names to many of the features, in 1645. He named this crater after himself; it is the only one of his named features that has retained his original designation.

Satellite craters 

By convention these features are identified on lunar maps by placing the letter on the side of the crater midpoint that is closest to Langrenus.

Many of the more significant associated craters that surround Langrenus have since been renamed by the IAU.

 Langrenus A — See Barkla.
 Langrenus B — See Naonobu.
 Langrenus C — See Acosta.
 Langrenus D — See Al-Marrakushi.
 Langrenus F — See Bilharz.
 Langrenus J — See Somerville.
 Langrenus K — See Atwood.

References

External links 

 LAC-80
 AS16-M-0666 view from Apollo 16
 At the Top of the Avalanche, on the central peak of Langrenus, from LROC
 
 Lights glow on Moon

Impact craters on the Moon